Chubin Dar (also Romanized as Chūbīn Dar and Choobindar; also known as Jūbīn Dar, Chūbīn, and Chundar) is a village in Eqbal-e Gharbi Rural District, in the Central District of Qazvin County, Qazvin Province, Iran. At the 2006 census, its population was 8,083, in 1,904 families.

References 

Populated places in Qazvin County